Joseph Albert Walding (18 June 1926 – 5 June 1985) was a New Zealand politician of the Labour Party. He represented the Palmerston North for several terms. After his retirement from Parliament, he became High Commissioner to the United Kingdom, but died within months of taking the post.

Biography

Early life
Walding was born in Christchurch, in 1926. He went to school in that city. When he was 15, he joined the New Zealand Merchant Navy and later the British Merchant Navy. The impressions that he gained through the war shaped his outlook on life. He became a carpenter after the war, working in the Wellington area.

He married Eileen Norma Walding (née Paul) of Feilding in 1950. They had six daughters. After the marriage, the couple moved to Palmerston North. Walding joined his mother's catering business, Smith and Walding. Together with his brother Charlie, he developed the company into a successful venture. In 1957, Walding established Prepared Foods Co Ltd, a gourmet food and canning business with an export focus.

Political career

Walding was first elected a member of the Palmerston North City Council in 1959; councillors were already elected for three year terms at that time. He was re-elected in 1962 and 1965. Having been elected to Parliament in 1967, he did not stand for the City Council again in 1968.

Following Brown's sudden death in 1967, Walding successfully contested the resulting  against four others: Gordon Cruden (National Party), John O'Brien (Social Credit Party), Goldingham (Progress) and Jamie Wedderspoon (Democratic Labour).

Walding represented the Palmerston North electorate for the next eight years. After entering parliament he was designated as Labour's spokesperson for the environment and conservation.

During the Third Labour Government between 1972 and 1975, he was Minister of Overseas Trade, Minister for the Environment, Minister for Sport and Recreation and Associate Minister of Foreign Affairs. As Minister for the Environment he was deeply involved in the government decision in February 1973 to not raise the level of Lake Manapouri, fulfilling one of Labour's key election pledge during the Save Manapouri campaign. He then helped create an independent body, the Guardians of Lake Manapouri, Monowai, and Te Anau (composed of leading members of the protest) to oversee management of the lake levels. As Minister for Sport and Recreation he initiated the "Come Alive" campaign in 1973 which urged Kiwis to get active and participate in sport and other physical hobbies.

As Minister of Overseas Trade he made major trading market breakthroughs with both China and the Soviet Union in response to New Zealand's need to grow overseas markets after the United Kingdom cut trading ties after joining the European Common Market. At the same time he still was able to achieve favourable concessions from the United Kingdom. He solved New Zealand's problem with a beef sales quota to the United States while on a visit to Mexico. He convinced Mexico to sell its beef supply to the United States allowing New Zealand to sell more of its beef surpluses to Mexico instead of the United States. Both countries benefitting from the arrangement. In 1973 he made the first official visit by a New Zealand government minister to China since the 1949 Chinese Communist Revolution and famously rode a bicycle down the Great Wall of China. He travelled with Agriculture and Fisheries minister Colin Moyle frequently to many overseas countries, particularly Iran, Russia and China, to open more export markets for New Zealand's primary produce.

In 1975 he was defeated by John Lithgow for the Palmerston North seat. Following his defeat he was elected vice-president of the Labour Party at the 1977 party conference (after failing to win the presidency) and was re-elected at the 1978 conference. In 1978 he in turn defeated Lithgow to regain the Palmerston North seat and return the parliament. Labour was still in opposition and he was appointed Shadow Minister of Trade and Industry and later Shadow Minister of Overseas Trade. In 1979 he stood again for the Labour Party presidency but was defeated by Jim Anderton 586 votes to 527.

A group of Labour MPs (Michael Bassett, Roger Douglas, Mike Moore and Richard Prebble) organised a challenge to Anderton for the presidency at the 1982 party conference. They approached Walding to stand for party president, though he declined.

He later became a key advisor to David Lange while he was leader of the opposition and was heavily involved in Labour's successful  election campaign. During the campaign he accompanied Lange on his hectic schedule of public hustings as an organiser and confidante earning him the title "Mr Lange's minder".

High Commissioner
In late 1984, he was appointed High Commissioner to the United Kingdom. In March 1985 he made a rare official visit to the Soviet Union and met with Soviet Premier Konstantin Chernenko just before Chernenko's death.

Death
Three months after starting the position, he died on 5 June 1985 in London. He collapsed following an evening dinner at his official residence in Chelsea before being rushed to St. Stephen's Hospital shortly after 10pm. He was survived by his wife and six daughters.

Walding's wife, Eileen Walding, was appointed a Companion of the Queen's Service Order for community service in the 1990 New Year Honours. She died in Havelock North on 8 June 2017.

Notes

References

1926 births
1985 deaths
People educated at Trinity Catholic College, Dunedin
Palmerston North City Councillors
New Zealand Labour Party MPs
New Zealand MPs for North Island electorates
Members of the Cabinet of New Zealand
20th-century New Zealand businesspeople
High Commissioners of New Zealand to the United Kingdom
Members of the New Zealand House of Representatives
Unsuccessful candidates in the 1975 New Zealand general election
Unsuccessful candidates in the 1966 New Zealand general election
New Zealand military personnel of World War II
British Merchant Navy personnel of World War II